Grégory Mounis (born 18 January 1985 in Perpignan, France) is a French former professional rugby league footballer who played in the 2000s and 2010s. He played for Catalans Dragons in the Super League competition.

Playing career
An established international, Mounis featured for France in the 2008 Rugby League World Cup and the 2013 Rugby League World Cup.

He announced his retirement from the sport following the 2016 Super League season.

Coaching
On 19 January 2021 it was announced that Mounis would take up the role of defensive consultant at Palau Broncos for the remainder of the season.

References

External links

Super League profile

1985 births
Living people
Catalans Dragons captains
Catalans Dragons players
France national rugby league team players
French rugby league players
Rugby league locks